Depop is a peer-to-peer social e-commerce company based in London, with additional offices in Manchester, Milan and New York City. The company has an expanding global presence being popularised in countries such as the United States, United Kingdom, Australia, New Zealand, and Italy. It allows users to buy and sell items, most of which are used and vintage pieces of clothing.

History 
Depop was founded in 2011 by entrepreneur Simon Beckerman at an Italian technological incubator and business H-Farm start-up centre. Paolo Barberis and Nana Bianca were two of the first investors in the platform in 2012 with a seed investment. Its headquarters were moved to London in 2012. Depop expanded and opened additional offices in Milan and New York City. Beckerman raised €1 million in funding in October 2013 from Red Circle Investment and brought on Faroese Runar Reistrup as new CEO. In 2015, Depop secured another investment of $8 million from Balderton Capital and Holtzbrinck Ventures. Most active users of Depop are located in the United Kingdom, Australia, United States and Italy. In March 2016, former CEO, Runar Reistrup, stated that Depop's growth was achieved through word of mouth. Depop was the official app sponsor of the 2016 Vans Warped Tour.

In June 2019, Depop raised $62 million in Series C from General Atlantic to fund its expansion. Previous investors HV Holtzbrinck Ventures, Balderton Capital, Creandum, Octopus Ventures, TempoCap and Sebastian Siemiatkowski also participated.

In 2020, Depop's gross merchandise sales and revenue both more than doubled to $650 million and $70 million respectively. In June 2021, Etsy announced it would acquire Depop for $1.6 billion in cash, making it Etsy's most expensive acquisition, but that Depop would continue operate as a standalone brand independent from Etsy.

Overview 
Depop is a social e-commerce platform where users can buy and resell their items. As a mobile app, it is available on iOS and Android platforms.

Most of the items sold on Depop are used, vintage, and repurposed pieces of clothing. Its user interface is modeled after that of Instagram, and users can sell items by posting pictures of them to their profiles, along with descriptions, hashtags, and prices. Many sellers model the clothes they sell themselves. Users can also follow other sellers, whose posts will appear in their feeds. The platform's "Explore" page features items picked out by Depop staff. Users can pay for items using PayPal. Depop users are also encouraged by the platform to use other social networking services such as Instagram to promote their shop profiles. Celebrities have resold their own items on Depop, with some donating proceeds to charitable causes.

As of 2021, Depop has over 21 million users, 90 percent of whom are under the age of 26. It is the 10th most-visited shopping platform for Gen Z consumers in the US, and, in a poll conducted by The Strategist in 2019, Depop was voted by teenagers as their favorite resale website. According to Taylor Lorenz of The Atlantic, Depop draws in Gen Z users through being easily accessible and having affordable prices, and much of its user base uses it to track trends in fashion. Popular sellers on the platform often go on to become social media influencers.

Criticism 
Depop has garnered criticism from users and critics due to a number of its sellers buying clothes from thrift shops and reselling them for higher prices than they were purchased for. The platform has also been criticized by its users for picking predominantly thin models wearing straight size clothing to showcase on its Explore page, which some have described as sizeist.

Depop and Paypal have been accused of collectively deceiving users into using their preferred private shipping partner, Evri, previously known as Hermes, a courier firm marred by allegations that its drivers mishandle parcels. Depop users who opt for using Royal Mail are penalised by being forced to pay Depop sales fees out of pocket and wait up to one month to receive their earnings. Paypal withholds those Depop user’s funds from any items sold for a minimum of 21 days from the date of sale.

In November 2019, Business of Fashion reported that users within the Depop app were receiving sexually suggestive messages.

References

External link 

 Homepage
Google Play link

Android (operating system) software
2021 mergers and acquisitions
Companies based in the City of London
Internet properties established in 2011
IOS software
Mobile applications
Online marketplaces of the United Kingdom
Retail companies established in 2011
Peer-to-peer software